= Molashiyeh =

Molashiyeh (Persian: ملاشيه) may refer to:

- Molashiyeh 1
- Molashiyeh 3
